The Agriculture (Poisonous Substances) Act 1952 was an Act of the Parliament of the United Kingdom passed to provide protection of employees against risks of poisoning by harmful substances in agriculture.

The act gave permission for the creation of inspectors to regulate harmful substances. The act itself was fully repealed by the Health and Safety (Repeals and Revocations) Regulations 1996.

United Kingdom Acts of Parliament 1952
Repealed United Kingdom Acts of Parliament
Agriculture legislation in the United Kingdom